Mundell is a surname. Notable people with the surname include:

 David Mundell (born 1962), politician
 Ed Mundell, guitarist
 Hugh Mundell (1962–1983), singer
 James Mundell (died 1762), educator
 Marc Mundell (born 1983), race walker
 Oliver Mundell, politician
 Robert Mundell (1932–2021), economist
 Tom Mundell, better known as Metrik, electronic music producer
 William D. Mundell (1912–1997), poet
 William Mundell, politician
 William Richard Mundell, military officer

See also
 Mundell Lowe (1922–2017), jazz musician
 Mundell Music, concert promoter